Antillorbis is a genus of gastropods belonging to the family Planorbidae.

The species of this genus are found in America.

Species:

Antillorbis aeruginosus 
Antillorbis nordestensis

References

Planorbidae